Harry Jefferson (9 March 1849 – 23 June 1918) was a British sailor who competed in the 1900 Summer Olympics in Paris, France. Jefferson took the gold in the second race of the 3 to 10 ton.

In 1885, Jefferson set up the stock-jobbing firm Wedd Jefferson in partnership with George Wedd.

References

External links

 

1849 births
1918 deaths
British male sailors (sport)
Sailors at the 1900 Summer Olympics – 3 to 10 ton
Olympic sailors of Great Britain
Olympic gold medallists for Great Britain
Olympic medalists in sailing
Medalists at the 1900 Summer Olympics
Sportspeople from Mumbai